The North Surrey Joint Sewage Board railways were three narrow gauge industrial railways serving the sewage plants around Berrylands station in Surbiton, south London.

Malden works 

In 1900 the Malden & Coombe Borough Council built a sewage works at Malden, near Surbiton. This works was modernized in 1939 and a  narrow gauge railway was installed. A Hunslet locomotive was purchased to run on this railway.

Berrylands works

In 1912 the North Surrey Joint Sewage Board built a new sewage works at Berrylands in Surbiton. In 1939 this works was also modernized. Sludge drying beds were constructed and a  narrow gauge railway was installed to serve them. The railway used 20 skip wagons supplied by Hudsons and a diesel locomotive built by F. C. Hibberd & Co.

Hogsmill works

Between the Berrylands and Malden works lay a tract of derelict land. As early as 1931, the Hogsmill Valley Joint Sewage Board proposed construction of a third sewage works. These plans were delayed by the Second World War, but the plant was built in 1953. A third  narrow railway was built. This was served by a second Hunslet locomotive.

Consolidation 

In 1961 the three works were amalgamated as the North Surrey Joint Sewage Board. The Hogsmill and Malden railways were connected via two bridges over the River Hogsmill. Another Hunslet locomotive was supplied.

Locomotives

See also

 British industrial narrow gauge railways

References 

2 ft gauge railways in England
Industrial railways in England